The 1959–60 NBA season was the Detroit Pistons' 12th season in the NBA and third season in the city of Detroit.  The team played at Olympia Stadium in Detroit.

The team finished with a 30-45 (.400) record, second in the Western Division, advancing to the playoffs, dropping the Western Conference semi-final 2-0 to the Minneapolis Lakers.  The team was led guard Gene Shue (22.8 ppg, NBA All-Star) and center Walter Dukes (15.2 ppg, 13.4 rpg).  The Pistons also featured rookie Bailey Howell who put up outstanding numbers (17.8 ppg, 10.5 rpg) on his way to a Hall of Fame career.

Regular season

Season standings

x – clinched playoff spot

Record vs. opponents

Game log

Playoffs

|- align="center" bgcolor="#ffcccc"
| 1
| March 12
| Minneapolis
| L 112–113
| Bailey Howell (29)
| Grosse Pointe South High School
| 0–1
|- align="center" bgcolor="#ffcccc"
| 2
| March 13
| @ Minneapolis
| L 99–114
| Gene Shue (27)
| Minneapolis Armory
| 0–2
|-

Awards and records
Gene Shue, All-NBA First Team

References

Detroit Pistons seasons
Detroit
Detroit Pistons
Detroit Pistons